Lupinus obtusilobus is a species of lupine known by the common name bluntlobe lupine. It is native to high mountains of northern California, including the North Coast Ranges, the Klamath Mountains, and the northernmost Sierra Nevada. It grows in various types of mountain habitat, sometimes carpeting meadows with its purple blooms in the spring. The herbage is coated in silvery silky hairs. The inflorescence is a small raceme with a few whorls of flowers each just over a centimeter long. The flower is blue to purple with a yellowish patch on its banner.

External links
Jepson Manual Treatment
Photo gallery

obtusilobus
Flora of California
Flora of Nevada
Flora without expected TNC conservation status